The 1895 Wimbledon Championships took place on the outdoor grass courts at the All England Lawn Tennis Club in Wimbledon, London, United Kingdom. The tournament ran from 8 July until 15 July. It was the 19th staging of the Wimbledon Championships, and the first Grand Slam tennis event of 1895. There were 18 competitors for the men's singles title, 9 for the ladies' singles and 7 pairs entered the gentleman's doubles. The meeting recorded its only loss, of 33 pounds. The tournament saw the Wimbledon Championship's first royal visitors when the Crown Princess of Austria, Princess Stéphanie of Belgium and Prince Edmund Batthyany-Strattmann watched the Gentleman's Doubles Challenge Rounds on 15 July.

The entry fee was £1 and 1 shilling for the gentleman's singles with the same amount levied per gentleman's doubles pair. The entry fee for the ladies singles was 10 shillings (s) and 6 pence (d). Ground admission for the whole meeting was 7s 6d. Daily entry for the first three days cost a shilling; it was 2s and 6d thereafter. A reserved covered seat on Centre Court for the duration of the championship cost 7s 6d or a shilling per day.

Finals

Men's singles

 Wilfred Baddeley defeated  Wilberforce Eaves 4–6, 2–6, 8–6, 6–2, 6–3

Women's singles

 Charlotte Cooper defeated  Helen Jackson 7–5, 8–6

Men's doubles

 Herbert Baddeley /  Wilfred Baddeley defeated  Wilberforce Eaves /  Ernest Lewis 8–6, 5–7, 6–4, 6–3

References

Bibliography

External links
 Official Wimbledon Championships website

 
Wimbledon Championships
Wimbledon Championships
Wimbledon Championships
Wimbledon Championships